Polesella is a comune (municipality) in the Province of Rovigo in the Italian region Veneto, located about  southwest of Venice and about  south of Rovigo.  
 
Polesella borders the following municipalities: Arquà Polesine, Bosaro, Canaro, Frassinelle Polesine, Guarda Veneta, Ro.

In 1509 it was the location of the homonymous battle between the Venetian fleet and the troops of Ferrara. The town is home to the Palazzo Grimani, a 16th-century patrician residence attributed to Vincenzo Scamozzi and the Villa Morosini (16th–17th centuries).

Twin towns
 Lučenec, Slovakia
 Svetvinčenat, Croatia

References

External links 

  

Cities and towns in Veneto